Tupper's self-referential formula is a formula that visually represents itself when graphed at a specific location in the (x, y) plane.

History 

The formula was defined by Jeff Tupper and appears as an example in Tupper's 2001 SIGGRAPH paper on reliable two-dimensional computer graphing algorithms. This paper discusses methods related to the GrafEq formula-graphing program developed by Tupper.

Although the formula is called "self-referential", Tupper did not name it as such.

Formula 

The formula is an inequality defined as:

where  denotes the floor function, and mod is the modulo operation.

Plots 
Let  equal the following 543-digit integer:

960939379918958884971672962127852754715004339660129306651505519271702802395266424689642842174350718121267153782770623355993237280874144307891325963941337723487857735749823926629715517173716995165232890538221612403238855866184013235585136048828693337902491454229288667081096184496091705183454067827731551705405381627380967602565625016981482083418783163849115590225610003652351370343874461848378737238198224849863465033159410054974700593138339226497249461751545728366702369745461014655997933798537483143786841806593422227898388722980000748404719

The formula is a general-purpose method of decoding a bitmap stored in the constant , and it could actually be used to draw any other image.  When applied to the unbounded positive range , the formula tiles a vertical swath of the plane with a pattern that contains all possible 17-pixel-tall bitmaps. One horizontal slice of that infinite bitmap depicts the drawing formula itself, but this is not remarkable, since other slices depict all other possible formulae that might fit in a 17-pixel-tall bitmap. Tupper has created extended versions of his original formula that rule out all but one slice.

The constant  is a simple monochrome bitmap image of the formula treated as a binary number and multiplied by 17. If  is divided by 17, the least significant bit encodes the upper-right corner ; the 17 least significant bits encode the rightmost column of pixels; the next 17 least significant bits encode the 2nd-rightmost column, and so on.

It fundamentally describes a way to plot points on a two-dimensional surface. In the fourth subplot the k-value of "AFGP" and "Aesthetic Function Graph" are added to get the resultant graph, where both the texts can be seen with some distortion, due to the effects of binary addition. The information regarding the shape of the plot is stored within .

See also

References

Footnotes

Notes

Sources

 Weisstein, Eric W. "Tupper's Self-Referential Formula." From MathWorld—A Wolfram Web Resource. 
 Bailey, D. H.; Borwein, J. M.; Calkin, N. J.; Girgensohn, R.; Luke, D. R.; and Moll, V. H. Experimental Mathematics in Action. Natick, MA: A. K. Peters, p. 289, 2006. 
 "Self-Answering Problems." Math. Horizons 13, No. 4, 19, April 2006
 Wagon, S. Problem 14 in stanwagon.com

External links 
 
 Extensions of Tupper's original self-referential formula
 TupperPlot, an implementation in JavaScript
 Tupper self referential formula, an implementation in Python
 The Library of Babel function, a detailed explanation of the workings of Tupper's self-referential formula
 Tupper's Formula Tools, an implementation in JavaScript
 Trávník's formula that draws itself close to the origin
 A video explaining the formula

Inequalities
Self-reference
2001 introductions
Computer graphics